Balloon busters were military pilots known for destroying enemy observation balloons. These pilots were noted for their fearlessness, as balloons were stationary targets able to receive heavy defenses, from the ground and the air. Seventy-seven flying aces in World War I were each credited with destroying five or more balloons, and thus were balloon aces.

The crucial role of observation balloons 

An observation balloon was both a vulnerable and a valuable target: the balloon was moored in a stationary position and was lifted by flammable hydrogen gas, whose use was necessitated by the scarcity of helium reserves among European powers. The artillery observer, suspended in the wicker basket beneath, typically had a wireless transmitter, binoculars and/or a long-range camera. His job was to observe actions on the front-line and behind it, to spot enemy troop movements or unusual activity of any sort, and to call down artillery fire onto any worthwhile targets.

Balloon observers were consequently targets of great importance to both sides, especially before any sort of infantry action or offensive, so individual pilots, flights or whole squadrons were frequently ordered to attack balloons, to destroy them or at least disrupt their observation activities. Pilots on both sides tried to attack from a height that could enable them to fire without getting too close to the hydrogen and pull away fast. They were also cautioned not to go below  in order to avoid machine gun and AA fire.

Due to their importance, balloons were usually given heavy defenses in the form of machine gun positions on the ground, anti-aircraft artillery, and standing fighter patrols stationed overhead. Other defenses included surrounding the main balloon with barrage balloons; stringing cables in the air in the vicinity of the balloons; equipping observers with machine guns; and flying balloons booby-trapped with explosives that could be remotely detonated from the ground. These measures made balloons very dangerous targets to approach.

Although balloons were occasionally shot down by small-arms fire, generally it was difficult to shoot down a balloon with solid bullets, particularly at the distances and altitude involved. Ordinary bullets would pass relatively harmlessly through the hydrogen gas bag, merely holing the fabric. Hits on the wicker car could however kill the observer.

One method employed was the solid-fuel Le Prieur rocket invented by Frenchman Lt. Yves Le Prieur and first used in April 1916. Rockets were attached to each outboard strut of a biplane fighter aircraft and fired through steel tubes using an electrical trigger. The rockets' inaccuracy was such that pilots had to fly very close to their target before firing.

It was not until special Pomeroy incendiary bullets and Buckingham flat-nosed incendiary bullets became available on the Western Front in 1917 that any consistent degree of success was achieved. Le Prieur rockets were withdrawn from service in 1918 once incendiary bullets had become available.

Balloon busting aces

Aces with four balloon victories

Aces with three balloon victories

Aces with two balloon victories

In literature
On the afternoon of September 14, 1918, while the Doughboys of the 33rd U.S. Infantry Division were stationed at Fromereville near Verdun, American war poet Lt. John Allan Wyeth was taking a shower with a group of bickering Doughboys when he heard the cry, "Air Raid!" Like every other bather, Wyeth ran, naked and covered with soap, into the village square. There, he watched as a Fokker D VII, flown by Unteroffizier Hans Heinrich Marwede from Jasta 67's aerodrome at Marville, attacked and  set on fire three French observation balloons. Lieut. Wyeth later described Marwede's victory in his sonnet Fromereville: War in Heaven.

William Sanders' novel The Wild Blue and the Gray was set in a World War I squadron that flew several balloon-busting missions.

In Wilbur Smith's The Burning Shore the lead character carries out balloon-busting missions during World War I.

DC Comics published a character known as Steve Savage, the Balloon Buster in All-American Men of War title in 1965.

See also
 Lists of World War I flying aces
 Incendiary balloon
 History of military ballooning

Notes

References

Bibliography
, .
, .
, .
, .
, .

Flying aces